Free refills occur when a drink's receptacle, usually that of a soft drink, tea or coffee, is allowed to be filled again by its purchaser, free of charge, after they have consumed the drink. Occasionally the glass or cup holding the drink is not reused, and the "refill" actually constitutes the acquisition of a second (or more than one) additional entirely new drink(s) for no added charge, usually of the same kind (e.g. the same brand of soft drink) as the original, paid-for drink. Free refills are commonplace in the United States and Canada in traditional restaurants and fast food restaurants, while rarer in airports, cafés, or service stations. Around the world, the availability of free refills is typically scarce, but varies widely depending on the country and the type and specific ownership or chain of each establishment.

History

Early America
Although no one can trace the exact roots of the "free refill", there are a few historical references. According to the book The World of Caffeine: The Science and Culture of the World's Most Popular Drug, around the 1890s if you were to ask a European visitor what in his opinion is the most noteworthy feature of American cafes, he is most likely to say, "they refill your cup without charge, without asking!" This book also contains another
historical reference; it refers to the American roots of free refill. It states, "perhaps, the endless refill is symbolic of America's special affection for coffee and its culture of largesse and informality as well".

Modern America
The now defunct Dallas chain restaurant Steak and Ale was the first to help popularize the now industry standard of free refills.

In 1988 Taco Bell launched their "value initiative" which included drive-through windows, reduced prices, and free refills. As a major soda company (PepsiCo) owned Taco Bell at that time, this was strategically done to increase revenue and build the drink company's brand awareness. Free refills are now offered in most American restaurants.

Worldwide availability

There is little consistency outside of North America regarding the availability of free refills. For example, Burger King restaurants in Spain often provide free refills, whereas in Bolivia, Burger King restaurants do not. In France, free refills have actually been outlawed; in Germany, most restaurants charge even to refill water (but not for KFC). In Japan, free refills are referred to as "drink bar" (ドリンクバー) and often a separate purchase is required to access them.

Marketing
Free refills are seen as a good way to attract customers to an establishment, especially one whose beverages are not their primary source of income. Due to the extremely low cost of fountain soft drinks (especially the beverage itself, not including the cost of the cup, lid and straw), often offering a profit margin of 80-82%, establishments tend to offer free refills as a sales gimmick. Coffee produces a similar high profit margin, allowing establishments to include coffee in free refill offers.
Most of these establishments have fast customer turnover, thus customers rarely consume enough beverage to make the offering unprofitable. Some establishments, who make their primary income with beverage sales, only offer free refills to members of rewards programs.

Bars in the United States often do not charge designated drivers for soft drinks, including refills.

Criticisms

United States
In certain areas of the United States, such as Massachusetts and New York, politicians have proposed banning free refills as a move against obesity. 

When New York City banned sugary drinks over 16 ounces in 2012, critics faulted free refills as one of the ban's biggest weaknesses.

In June 2012 Cambridge, Massachusetts, mayor Henrietta Davis unsuccessfully proposed banning soft drink refills.

France
The French government is another critic of free refills, due to health concerns about obesity. France created a tax on sugary drinks in 2011. In September 2014, Serge Hercberg, head of France's National Nutrition and Health Programme, stated that free refills of sugary drinks should be banned. In January 2017, a law was passed banning the unlimited sale of pop and other sugary drinks at all public eateries.

See also
Refill (scheme)

References

Restaurant terminology